Hofors is a locality and the seat of Hofors Municipality, Gävleborg County, Sweden with 6,681 inhabitants in 2010.

Districts
Born                    
Böle
Bönhusberget
Centrum
Göklund
Hammaren
Lillån
Muntebo
Rönningen
Silverdalen
Standarn
Västerhöjden
Robertsholm
Fagersta by
Långnäs
Barkhyttan
Stenshyttan
The town of Hofors evolved around an iron industry in the 17th century, which eventually developed into one of Sweden's foremost ironworks, and a subsidiary of the SKF group.

Notable people 
Kerstin Hesselgren, first woman elected into the upper house of Swedish parliament
Andreas Johansson, former NHL player
Ulf Söderström, ice hockey player
Lasse Åberg, artist, actor, film director and musician

Sports
The following sports clubs are located in Hofors:

 Hofors AIF

Hofors World Cup was an international rink bandy competition played annually 1984–1998.

References 

Populated places in Hofors Municipality
Gästrikland
Municipal seats of Gävleborg County
Swedish municipal seats